The Kiev Major was a professional Dota 2 esport tournament that was held in April 2017 at the National Palace of Arts in Kyiv, Ukraine. The tournament featured eight directly invited teams, as well as eight qualified teams from six different worldwide regions.

The open qualifiers tournament was held on March 6–9, 2017, followed by the regional qualifiers held on March 10–13, 2017. For the first time in an officially sponsored tournament, Valve, the game's developer and tournament administrator, split the previously single Americas region into North and South America, as well as creating the CIS region out of Europe. The event had a $3 million prize pool, with the winning team taking $1 million. The best-of-five grand finals took place between OG and Virtus.pro, with OG taking the series 3–2, winning them their fourth Dota 2 Major championship.

Teams

Bracket
All series were played to a best-of-three, with the exception being the best-of-five grand finals.

Results 

(Note: Prizes are in USD)

Notes

References

External links

Dota 2 Majors
2017 in esports
2017 multiplayer online battle arena tournaments
April 2017 sports events in Europe
Sports competitions in Kyiv
2017 in Ukrainian sport
International esports competitions hosted by Ukraine
Professional Gamers League competitions